The New York Medical Journal is an American medical journal. It was first published in 1865.

References 

General medical journals